General French may refer to:

Francis Henry French (1857–1921), U.S. Army major general
George Arthur French (1841–1921), British Army major general
John French, 1st Earl of Ypres (1852–1925), British Army general
Samuel Gibbs French (1818–1910), Confederate States Army major general
William H. French (1815–1881), U.S. Army major general

See also
:Category:French generals